Hebenstretia minutiflora is a species of plant from South Africa. It belongs to the figwort family.

Description 
It branches at the base. Individuals may survive for only one year (annual) or may be present for several years (perennial). The leaves are lance-shaped and toothed. White flowers are present between September and December. They grow in spikes The fruit is an oblong capsule with two equal mericarps.

Distribution and habitat 
This species in endemic to the Northern Cape of South Africa.

Conservation 
This species is classified as being of least concern.

References 

Plants described in 1901
Flora of South Africa
Scrophulariaceae